The Star and the Story is an American television anthology series which aired 1955–1956 in first-run syndication. A filmed half-hour series, episodes were approximately 25 minutes long, excluding commercials.

Produced by Four Star Productions, it was similar in some respects to Four Star Playhouse and Stage 7.

Henry Fonda was the host. With a new cast each week, the series featured a wide range of actors, often well-known character actors such as Edmond O'Brien and occasionally emerging stars such as Joanne Woodward.  Notable directors included Blake Edwards and Robert Stevenson.

O'Brien starred in the premiere episode, "The Stranger".

It appears the series has entered the public domain; a number of episodes appear on budget public domain DVD releases.

Overseas syndication
During the late-1950s it was exported to Australia (as were Four Star Playhouse, Stage 7, Studio 57, etc.) where it often aired under the title Whitehall Playhouse (combined with episodes of Studio 57). With limited television budgets Australian broadcasters were unable to produce a weekly anthology series of their own during the 1950s (the monthly 1959–1960 series Shell Presents was the closest to such a series, along with standalone twice-monthly plays on ABC from 1957 to early 1960s), and as such several American anthology series were shown there, along with a few British anthology series and at least one Canadian anthology. Others shown included Ford Television Theatre (re-titled Kraft TV Theatre, no relation to Kraft Television Theatre), Short Short Dramas (re-titled Playhouse 15) and Science Fiction Theatre.

References

External links
The Star and the Story at CVTA with episode list archived at the Wayback Machine
The Star and the Story on IMDb
Episode Dark Stranger viewable on the Internet Archive
Episode Payment in Kind viewable on the Internet Archive

1955 American television series debuts
1956 American television series endings
1950s American anthology television series
Black-and-white American television shows
Television series by Four Star Television
First-run syndicated television programs in the United States